Kurunda (Korımdu) is a rural locality (a selo) in Ust-Koksinsky District, the Altai Republic, Russia. The population was 216 as of 2016. There are 6 streets.

Geography 
Kurunda is located 14 km northeast of Ust-Koksa (the district's administrative centre) by road. Kastakhta is the nearest rural locality.

References 

Rural localities in Ust-Koksinsky District